Nathalie Deruelle (born 1952) is a French physicist specializing in general relativity and known for her research on the two-body problem in general relativity and on cosmological perturbation theory.

Education and career
Deruelle began her studies at the École normale supérieure in 1971, earned an agrégation in 1975, then, after visiting positions at the European Space Agency and the University of Cambridge, completed a doctorate in 1982 at Pierre and Marie Curie University.

Formerly a director of research for the French National Centre for Scientific Research, associated with Paris Diderot University, she is now listed as a researcher emeritus.

Books
Deruelle is the author of books including:
Relativity in Modern Physics (with Jean-Philippe Uzan, 2018)
Les ondes gravitationnelles (with Jean-Pierre Lasota, 2018)
De Pythagore à Einstein, tout est nombre : la relativité générale, 25 siècles d'histoire (2015)
Théories de la relativité (with Jean-Philippe Uzan, 2014)

Recognition
Deruelle was named a Fellow of the International Society on General Relativity and Gravitation in 2013 "for her contributions to the two-body problem in general relativity and to relativistic cosmology".

References

1952 births
Living people
French physicists
French women physicists